This page lists Japan-related articles with titles beginning with a numeral or a symbol. For names of people, please list by surname (i.e., "Tarō Yamada" should be listed under "Y", not "T").

Symbol
.hack
.hack//GIFT
.hack//Legend of the Twilight
.hack//SIGN

0
0rphen
0 Series Shinkansen

1 (one)
18th Infantry Regiment
100 Series Shinkansen
100-yen shop
1955 System
1964 Summer Olympics
1998 Winter Olympics

2
200 Series Shinkansen
23 special wards
25143 Itokawa
2channel

3
300 Series Shinkansen

4
400 Series Shinkansen
47 Ronin

5 (five)
500 Series Shinkansen

6
64DD

7
700 Series Shinkansen
700T Series Shinkansen
735–737 Japanese smallpox epidemic

8
800 Series Shinkansen

See also
List of Japan-related topics

0–9